Park Tower is a skyscraper located at 800 North Michigan Avenue in Chicago, Illinois. It is one of the world's tallest buildings to be clad with architectural precast concrete (the Transamerica Pyramid Building in San Francisco is taller). It is one of the tallest non-steel framed structures in the world—it is a cast-in-place concrete framed structure. But later, the ceiling heights were increased allowing it to reach .

Because of the small footprint and the fact that it is a non-steel-framed concrete building, this is the first building in the US to be designed with a tuned mass damper from the outset. While other skyscrapers in America have anti-sway systems, they were always added later. A tuned mass damper counteracts wind effects on the structure. (The 300-ton damper is a massive steel pendulum hung from four cables inside a square cage.) Because of its massive weight, the damper has inertia that helps stabilize the building from swaying in the wind.

Designed by Chicago architectural firm Lucien Lagrange Architects, Park Tower is a mixed-use tower. As the name suggests, the lower portion holds a Park Hyatt Hotel while the upper levels contain luxury condominiums.

Levels 9, 19, and the crown are mechanical areas. Floors 2 to 18 are hotel spaces, Floors 20 to 55 are residential apartments and Floors 56 to 70 are private condominiums. With its location on the prestigious Magnificent Mile, Park Tower is also home to the acclaimed restaurant NoMi.

See also
List of buildings
List of skyscrapers
List of tallest buildings in Chicago
List of tallest buildings in the United States
World's tallest structures

References
Phorio

External links

Park Hyatt Chicago
Lucien Lagrange Architects

Residential skyscrapers in Chicago
Condo hotels in the United States
Residential condominiums in Chicago
Residential buildings completed in 2000
New Classical architecture
Streeterville, Chicago
2000 establishments in Illinois